The 2016–17 San Jose State Spartans men's basketball team represented San Jose State University during the 2016–17 NCAA Division I men's basketball season. The Spartans, led by fourth year head coach Dave Wojcik, played their home games at the Event Center Arena as members of the Mountain West Conference. They finished the season 14–16, 7–11 in Mountain West play to finish in a tie for eighth place. They lost in the first round of the Mountain West tournament to Utah State.

On July 10, 2017 Dave Wojcik resigned as head coach for personal reasons. On August 4, the school hired Jean Prioleau as head coach.

Previous season
The Spartans finished the season 9–22, 4–14 in Mountain West play to finish in last place. During the season, the Spartans were invited and participated in the Great Alaska Shootout in Anchorage, Alaska. During the tournament, they defeated San Diego and Alaska–Anchorage to earn 5th place. In the postseason, they lost in the first round of the Mountain West tournament to Colorado State.

Offseason

Departures

2016 recruiting class

2017 recruiting class

Roster

Schedule and results

|-
!colspan=9 style="background:#005a8b; color:#c79900;"| Exhibition

|-
!colspan=9 style="background:#005a8b; color:#c79900;"| Non-conference regular season\

|-
!colspan=9 style="background:#005a8b; color:#c79900;"| Mountain West regular season

|-
!colspan=9 style="background:#005a8b; color:#c79900;"| Mountain West tournament

References

San Jose State Spartans men's basketball seasons
San Jose State
San Jose State Spartans men's basketball
San Jose State Spartans men's basketball